Graptodytes delectus is a species of beetle in family Dytiscidae. It is endemic to Spain.

References

Dytiscidae
Beetles of Europe
Endemic insects of the Canary Islands
Endemic fauna of Spain
Beetles described in 1864
Taxonomy articles created by Polbot